USS Excel (AM-439) was an Aggressive-class minesweeper: laid down, 9 February 1953 as AM-439 at the Higgins Corp., New Orleans, Louisiana; launched, 25 September 1953; reclassified an Ocean Minesweeper (non-magnetic) MSO-439, 7 February 1955; commissioned USS Excel (MSO-439), 24 February 1955.

West Coast operations
USS Excel arrived at Long Beach, California, her home port, 4 June 1955, and began operating along the west coast in training and exercises. In 1956, and again in 1959, she served in the Far East with the U.S. 7th Fleet, visiting Japan, the Philippines, Hong Kong, Korea, and Taiwan, and exercising with ships of friendly navies. Through 1960 she continued to sail out of Long Beach, California, for operations and cruises along the west coast.

Minediv 93 went on a WesPac during the summer of 1961. On 27 August 1961, Commander Mine Division 93, with ocean minesweepers USS Leader (MSO 490) and USS Excel (MSO 439), made the first official visit by ships of the US Navy to Phnom Penh, the capital of Cambodia. The only time US Navy ships visited the capital until USS Gary visited in February 2007.

During the Vietnam war USS Excel was involved in Operation Market Time which interdicted arms smuggling from North Vietnam to the many rivers and estuaries of South Vietnam by everything that could float, now considered the most successful naval operation of the Vietnam war, although it led to the vast improvement of the Ho Chi Minh trail.

USS Excel was sent to the reserve fleet in the 1970s and was sent to its new home port, Treasure Island in the middle of San Francisco Bay.

Rear Admiral Albert T. Church III served as captain of USS Excel during the late 1970s when he was a lieutenant commander.

Captain Gerald F. Deconto was the Engineering Officer of Excel during the early 1980s when he was a newly graduated ensign; Deconto was killed at the Pentagon on 11 September 2001.

Decommissioning 
USS Excel was decommissioned, 30 September 1992; struck from the Naval Register, 28 March 1994; laid up in the Reserve Fleet; sold for scrapping to Crowley Marine, January 2000.

References

External links 
 NavSource Online: Mine Warfare Vessel Photo Archive - AM / MSO-439 Excel

 

Aggressive-class minesweepers
Ships built in New Orleans
1953 ships
Vietnam War mine warfare vessels of the United States